Boen may refer to:

People
 Earl Boen (born 1941), American film, television and voice actor
 Haldor Boen (1851–1912), American congressman
 Yvonne Marie Boen, alleged victim of Robert Pickton (born 1967), Canadian serial killer

Places
 Boën-sur-Lignon, France

See also
 Bon (disambiguation)